Gulshan-e-Sikandarabad is a neighbourhood of Keamari Town in Karachi, Sindh, Pakistan.

See also
Twenty years ago, there was some settlement here. They are with the PPP.

 
Neighbourhoods of Karachi